Limnophila repens, the creeping marshweed, is a herbaceous plant belonging to the family Plantaginaceae. It grows up to 45 cm tall both in terrestrial and fresh water habitats. The plant has a strong aromatic smell. Stems are covered with fine hair. Leaves are subsessile opposite and oblong. Violet-pink(rarely yellow) flowers are axilary and solitary or in short racemes. Seeds are angular and brown. Flowering season: November to May.

References

Plantaginaceae
Taxa named by George Bentham